813 Naval Air Squadron was an aircraft squadron of the Royal Navy's Fleet Air Arm during World War II and again post-war. It initially operated Swordfish Mk Is from the aircraft carrier Illustrious and took part in the successful raid on Taranto in November 1940.

In July 1943, the squadron was a component of RAF Gibraltar but a detachment of its Swordfish (torpedo spotter reconnaissance) was based at Tafaraoui, Algeria and assigned to the Northwest African Coastal Air Force (NACAF) for Operation Husky.

From April 1944 the squadron, including a detachment of Wildcats and three Fulmar NF II night fighters, were deployed on the escort carrier HMS Campania operating in the Arctic Ocean on convoy duty. On 13 December 1944 two of 813's Swordfish were responsible for the sinking of German submarine U-365 by depth charges.

Postwar, the squadron was tasked as a torpedo fighter unit, initially equipped with Blackburn Firebrand aircraft. Between February 1953 and April 1958 the squadron was equipped with turboprop powered Westland Wyvern strike aircraft. 813 Squadron disbanded for the last time on 22 April 1958.

References

Bishop, Chris (ed) The Encyclopedia of 20th Century Air Warfare Amber Books, Ltd. 2004 
Sturtivant, Ray The Squadrons of the Fleet Air Arm Air-Britain (Historians) Ltd, 1994, .

800 series Fleet Air Arm squadrons